Gibbomodiola adriatica is a species of mussel commonly known as the Adriatic mussel. It can be found in: France, Ireland, the Mediterranean Sea, the North Atlantic Ocean, Sweden, Ukraine, and the United Kingdom.

References

Bivalves described in 1819
Mytilidae